Pichu Sambamoorthi (1901–1973) was an Indian musicologist, writer and the professor of musicology at the Sri Venkateswara University, Tirupati. He was the author several books on music, including A Dictionary of South Indian Music and Musicians, Great composers, South Indian Music, Sruthi Vadyas (Drones) and Laya Vadyas: Time-Keeping Instruments. He was awarded the Madras Music Academy's Sangeetha Kalanidhi in 1972. The Government of India awarded him the third highest civilian honour of the Padma Bhushan, in 1971, for his contributions to music. He was also a 1963 recipient of the Sangeet Natak Akademi Fellowship.

Biography 
Born on 14 February 1901 at Bitragunta, a small village in the erstwhile Madras Presidency (presently in Guntur district, Andhra Pradesh), Sambamoorthi trained in vocals and violin under various teachers such as Boddu Krishniah, M. Doraiswami Iyer, S. A. Ramaswami Iyer and Krishnaswami Bhagavatar. He started his career, in 1928, as a member of faculty of music at Queen Mary's College but moved to Germany, in 1931, under a grant from Deutsche Akademie, and studied musicology at the academy, simultaneously learning Hochschule für Musik und Theater München, then known as Staatliche Akademie der Tonkunst. On his return to India, he joined Madras University as a lecturer and, later, a Reader in Music, and continued there till 1961 when he joined Sangita Vadyalaya, Chennai, as its director. In 1964, he was appointed as the Professor of Musicology at Sri Venkateswara University, Tirupati, a post he held for two years, till his return to Madras University in 1966.

Sambamoorthi was associated with several universities in India, including Banaras Hindu University, under a University Grants Commission programme. He published over 50 books which included a six-volume treatise, South Indian Music and a two-volume biographical account, Great Composers. The Catalogue of Musical Instruments, in display at the Government Museum, Chennai, was prepared by him in 1962, which has since gone into several re-prints. He received the third highest civilian honour of the Padma Bhushan from the Government of India in 1971. A year later, he was selected for the Sangeetha Kalanidhi award by the Madras Music Academy.

Sambamoorthi, who was married to Anandavalli, died on 23 October 1973, at the age of 72. His life and work have been documented in a book, Prof. Sambamoorthy, the Visionary Musicologist, published by Madras Music Academy, in connection with his birth centenary in 2001.

Selected bibliography

English

Tamil

See also 
 Hochschule für Musik und Theater München
 Deutsche Akademie
 Madras Music Academy

References

External links

Further reading 
 
 
 Sriram, V  (2019) "Lost Landmarks of Chennai", Madras Musings, Vol. XXIX No. 16, December 1-15, 2019

Recipients of the Padma Bhushan in arts
1901 births
1973 deaths
University of Music and Performing Arts Munich alumni
Sangeetha Kalanidhi recipients
Academic staff of the University of Madras
Banaras Hindu University people
Indian musicologists
Indian male writers
People from Nellore district
Recipients of the Sangeet Natak Akademi Fellowship
Indian social sciences writers
English-language writers from India
Writers from Andhra Pradesh
Musicians from Andhra Pradesh
Scholars from Andhra Pradesh
20th-century Indian educational theorists
20th-century musicologists